Government Science College , Dhaka, also known as GSC, is a public higher secondary school as well as a degree college affiliated to the National University.

It is one of the oldest educational institutions in Dhaka, Bangladesh established in 1962.

See also
 Government Science College Attached High School

Notable alumni 

 A.N.M. Ehsanul Hoque Milan
Anisul Haque

References

External links
 

Colleges in Dhaka District
1954 establishments in East Pakistan
Educational institutions established in 1954